Estrellados is a 1930 American pre-Code comedy film directed by Salvador de Alberich and Edward Sedgwick, and written by Salvador de Alberich, Paul Dickey and Richard Schayer. The film stars Buster Keaton, Raquel Torres, Don Alvarado, María Calvo, Juan de Homs and Carlos Villarías.

The film was released on July 7, 1930, by Metro-Goldwyn-Mayer. The film serves as the Spanish-language version of Free and Easy.

Plot

Cast
Buster Keaton as Canuto Cuadratin
Raquel Torres as Elvira Rosas
Don Alvarado as Larry Mitchell
María Calvo as La Mamà Rosas
Juan de Homs as Director
Carlos Villarías as Jack Collier
Lionel Barrymore as himself 
William Haines as himself 
John Miljan as himself 
Gwen Lee as herself 
Cecil B. DeMille as himself 
Fred Niblo as himself

References

External links
 

1930 films
1930s Spanish-language films
Spanish-language American films
American comedy films
1930 comedy films
Metro-Goldwyn-Mayer films
Films directed by Edward Sedgwick
American black-and-white films
American multilingual films
1930 multilingual films
1930s American films
Films with screenplays by Richard Schayer